Ayrim crespo eh linda

Ayrums, an ethnic group
Aşağı Ayrım, Azerbaijan
Yuxarı Ayrım, Azerbaijan